The green beret was the headgear of the British Commandos of World War II.

Green Berets may also refer to:

Military
 The green beret was the official headdress of the British Commandos of the Second World War.
 Green Berets, a nickname of United States Army Special Forces
 Green Berets, the Portuguese Paratroopers
 Green beret, a colour of military beret (and a list of forces with green berets)
 Green Berets, Zelene beretke, a paramilitary organization founded in Sarajevo, Republic of Bosnia and Herzegovina in early 1992
 Green berets, nickname for the Iranian 65th Airborne Special Forces Brigade soldiers

Arts
 The Green Berets (book), a 1965 book by Robin Moore
 The Green Berets (film), the 1968 film version of Moore's book starring John Wayne
 The Green Beret (animation), a 1992 animated short film by Stephen Hillenburg
 Green Beret (arcade game), also known as Rush'n Attack, a Cold War video game

See also
 Green Berets in popular culture
 "The Ballad of the Green Berets", a 1966 American patriotic song in the ballad style
 Tales of the Green Beret, a daily comic strip and American comic book